The following table shows the world record progression in the men's 10 kilometres walk, as recognised by the IAAF.

World record progression

References

Walk, 10 km men
Records